Alonso Verdugo de Castilla (3 September 1706 in Alcala la Real, province of Jaen – 27 March 1767 in Torino, Italy) was a Spanish count.

Biography
He became the 3rd Count of Torrepalma after around 1721, on the death of his father the Pedro Verdugo, 2nd Count of Torrepalma, from Seville, a Knight of the Order of Alcantara since 1668, who had married in Seville on 6 January 1685 Isabel de Castilla y Lasso de Castilla, baptized in Granada on 20 July 1672 - Granada, 1737).

His mother was one of the daughters of Sancho de Castilla y Lasso de Castilla, 9th Señor de Gor, province of Granada, señor de Alboloduy, province of Almeria, and Herrera de Valdecañas, province of Palencia, an illegitimate descent of King Pedro I of Castile, (assassinated by his bastard brother Enrique, afterwards King Enrique II of Castile in Montiel in March 1369).

He became a member of the Maestranza de Caballeria of Granada aged 19, on 18 October 1725, becoming a Knight of the Order of Calatrava in 1756, aged 50.

From 1740 to 1767, he was a member of the Real Academia Española de la Lengua, and the Real Academia de la Historia, a plenipotentiary minister for Spain in Vienna from 1755 to 1760 and from 1760 to 1767 in Torino, Italy, then the capital of the Duchy of Savoy.

He was the first husband (without issue) of the 3rd Duchess of Montemar, María Francisca Dávila y Carrillo de Albornoz, (??? - Calatayud, province of Zaragoza, 24 Enero 1808) and therefore, the 4th Count was then his nephew Alonso Diego Álvarez de Bohorques y Verdugo (Granada, 1710 - granted a life Grandee of Spain on 19 November 1771 - ????).

Bibliography and Internet links
 https://web.archive.org/web/20080410192532/http://www.telefonica.net/web2/garciaverdugo/fotos.htm

External links

(about his wife family connections)

(about the "Academia granadina del Tripode" operating with some literary friends between 1737, when his mother died in Granada, and 1747, when he went to live to Madrid).

1706 births
1767 deaths
Members of the Royal Spanish Academy
Counts of Spain
Ambassadors of Spain to Austria
Knights of Calatrava